Tulipani, Love, Honour and a Bicycle is a 2017 Dutch comedy film, written by Peter van Wijk and directed by Mike van Diem. It was shortlisted by the EYE Film Institute Netherlands as one of the eight films to be selected as the potential Dutch submission for the Academy Award for Best Foreign Language Film at the 90th Academy Awards. However, it was not selected, with Layla M. being chosen as the Dutch entry.

Cast
 Ksenia Solo as Anna
 Giancarlo Giannini as Catarella
 Gijs Naber as Gauke
 Lidia Vitale as Immacolata
 Donatella Finocchiaro as Chiara
 Giorgio Pasotti as Piero

References

External links
 
 Tulipani, Love, Honour and a Bicycle at Library and Archives Canada

2017 films
2017 comedy films
Dutch comedy films
2010s Dutch-language films
Films directed by Mike van Diem
Canadian comedy films
Italian comedy films